Claire Cloninger (August 12, 1942 – August 15, 2019) was an American songwriter of contemporary Christian music, author and speaker. She (co-)wrote hundreds of songs, including "You Gave Me Love When Nobody Gave Me A Prayer" with Archie Jordan for B. J. Thomas, "Friend of a Wounded Heart" for Wayne Watson (who was also a co-writer), and songs for Sandi Patty and Paul Overstreet. She authored 18 books, including Making ‘I Do’ Last a Lifetime, Dear Abba: Finding the Father’s Heart Through Prayer, and Postcards for People Who Hurt. She won six Dove Awards from the Gospel Music Association.

References

1942 births
2019 deaths
American women songwriters
American Christian writers
American women non-fiction writers
20th-century American musicians
20th-century American non-fiction writers
20th-century American women writers
21st-century American musicians
21st-century American non-fiction writers
21st-century American women writers
People from Fairhope, Alabama
Songwriters from Alabama
Songwriters from Louisiana
Women religious writers
Writers from Alabama
Writers from Lafayette, Louisiana